Maurice J. M. Larkin (1932 – 2004) was an English historian specialising in the history of modern France. Between 1976 and 1999 he held the Richard Pares Chair of History at Edinburgh University. Larkin was also a Fellow of the Royal Historical Society.

Selected works 
 Gathering Pace; Continental Europe 1870-1945. New York: Humanities Press, 1970.
 Church and State after the Dreyfus Affair. The Separation Issue in France. London: Macmillan, 1974
 Translated into French as: L’Église et l’État en France. 1905 : la crise de la Séparation, Toulouse : Privat, Bibliothèque historique universelle, 2004
 Man and Society in Nineteenth-Century Realism. Macmillan, 1977
 France since the Popular Front : Government and People, 1936-1986. Oxford University Press, 1988, 1997
 Religion, Politics and Preferment in France since 1890. La Belle Époque and its Legacy. Cambridge University Press, 1995, 2002.

Reception 

His 1974 book on the events surrounding the 1905 separation of church and state in France was described as "a classic on French history of secularism" and as "still the standard account of the subject".

See also 
 France in the twentieth century
 Jean Baubérot

References 

People from Harrow on the Hill
Alumni of Trinity College, Cambridge
Academics of the University of Glasgow
Academics of the University of Kent
Academics of the University of Edinburgh
Historians of France
1932 births
2004 deaths
20th-century English historians